Peine Island is a small island west of Beagle Island in the Danger Islands, southeast of Joinville Island off the Antarctic Peninsula.

The descriptive name "Islote Peine" (meaning "Comb Island") was given by the Argentine Ministry of Defense in 1979.  The Advisory Committee on Antarctic Names  approved the name in 1993 with the generic term Island.

See also 
 List of Antarctic and sub-Antarctic islands

Islands of the Joinville Island group